Penelope Murray is an expert in ancient history with an interest in ancient poetics and the Muses. After research posts at King's College London and St Anne's College, Oxford, she was a founder member of the department of Classics at the University of Warwick, with promotion to Senior Lectureship in 1998. After retiring from Warwick, Murray has been working on the Blackwell Companion to Ancient Aesthetic, co-editing with Pierre Destrée.

Selected publications

References

External links 

 BBC Radio 4 In Our Time (radio series) link on "The Muses". Penelope Murray on the panel with Paul Cartledge and Angie Hobbs.

British women historians
Academics of the University of Warwick
Living people
Year of birth missing (living people)